Vydrino is a rural locality (a selo) in Kabansky District, Republic of Buryatia, Russia. The population was 4,374 as of 2010. There are 22 streets.

Geography 
Vydrino is located 167 km southwest of Kabansk (the district's administrative centre) by road. Novosnezhnaya is the nearest rural locality.

References 

Rural localities in Kabansky District
Populated places on Lake Baikal